Vacsay ( from Old Norse "bakkiey" meaning "peat bank island") is one of the Outer Hebrides. It is off the west coast of Lewis in West Loch Roag.

History
Like many of the surrounding islands, Vacsay is uninhabited due to the Highland Clearances, which occurred here in 1827.

It was bought in 1993 by Sirdar Baron Iqbal Singh, a London business man, who currently lives in Lesmahagow. He has bought the title, "Lord of Butley Manor" and also wishes to rename Vacsay, "Robert Burns' island" or Eilean Burns, although Burns never visited the Outer Hebrides.

Geography and geology
The island is Lewisian gneiss.

Vacsay has an extremely complicated coastline, and is connected at low tide to several surrounding islets such as Trathasam, and Liacam.

It is between the islands of Vuia Mòr and Pabay Mòr and is off Great Bernera.

Footnotes

Islands of Loch Ròg
Cleared places in the Outer Hebrides
Uninhabited islands of the Outer Hebrides